The Crimebusters is a 1961 film directed by Boris Sagal. It stars Mark Richman and Martin Gabel. The film was composed of episodes of the American television series Cain's Hundred.

Cast
Mark Richman as Nicholas Cain
Martin Gabel as George Vincent
Phillip Pine as Phil Krajac
Carol Eve Rossen as Stella
Gavin MacLeod as Harry Deiner
Bruce Dern as Joe Krajac

See also
 List of American films of 1961

References

External links

1961 films
Films directed by Boris Sagal
American crime drama films
Films scored by Jerry Goldsmith
Metro-Goldwyn-Mayer films
1961 directorial debut films
1961 drama films
1960s English-language films
1960s American films